PKP Energetyka S.A. is the cross-country electricity distributor to the Polish railway network and other business customers. It also provides nationwide maintenance and emergency response services to the railway network, operates fuel stations for diesel locomotives and is active in electricity and gas reselling. It owns 20,000 km of distribution network and operates a fleet of highly specialised trains and rail equipment across Poland.

It was created as the result of the division of Polskie Koleje Państwowe (Poland's state-owned railway company) into several dozen companies to prepare the ground for privatisation in line with advice that the Polish government had received from the World Bank.

PKP SA originally planned to privatise PKP Energetyka in 2011. and sold it to CVC Capital Partners for 1.965 billion PLN (~525 million USD) in September 2015.

In late 2022, it was reported that the Polish Pis government might buy PKP Energetyka back from CVC Capital Partners.

See also 
 Transportation in Poland
 List of railway companies
 Polish locomotives designation
 PKP Group

References

Railway companies of Poland
PKP Group companies
Energy companies of Poland